Dwayne L. Polee Sr. (born March 2, 1963) is an American former professional basketball player and coach who has been the director of player development at the University of San Francisco since 2012. From 2007 to 2010, he was the director of basketball operations at the University of Southern California. Polee graduated from Manual Arts High School in 1981 and first attended the University of Nevada, Las Vegas  before transferring to Pepperdine University in 1982. He was drafted in the third round of the 1986 NBA draft by the Los Angeles Clippers and played in one game with the team during the 1986–87 season. He played basketball for two years in Mexico with Limoneros de Colima from 1989 to 1991. Following his retirement from playing, Polee served as an assistant coach at Los Angeles Southwest College during the 2000–01 season.

Polee, a 6'5" swingman, was the 1981 Los Angeles City Section Player of the Year at Manual Arts. He turned in perhaps the greatest individual performance in City championship game history when he scored 43 points in Manual Arts' 82-69 victory over Crenshaw High School at the Los Angeles Memorial Sports Arena in front of 14,123, the largest crowd in city history.

His son, Dwayne Jr., also won the Los Angeles City Section Player of the Year in 2010 playing for Westchester High School.  They were the second father–son combo to achieve the distinction. Dwayne Jr. played college ball for San Diego State.

Notes

References

External links
College & NBA stats @ basketballreference.com

1963 births
Living people
20th-century African-American sportspeople
21st-century African-American people
African-American basketball players
American men's basketball players
Basketball players from Los Angeles
Los Angeles Clippers draft picks
Los Angeles Clippers players
McDonald's High School All-Americans
Parade High School All-Americans (boys' basketball)
Pepperdine Waves men's basketball players
Shooting guards
Small forwards
UNLV Runnin' Rebels basketball players
USC Trojans men's basketball coaches